Zeyad Mater (born December 18, 1991) is a Yemeni judoka. He competed at the 2016 Summer Olympics in the men's 73 kg event, in which he was eliminated in the second round by Victor Scvortov. He was the flag bearer for Yemen at the Parade of Nations.

References

External links
 

1991 births
Living people
Yemeni male judoka
Olympic judoka of Yemen
Judoka at the 2016 Summer Olympics
Judoka at the 2010 Asian Games
Judoka at the 2014 Asian Games
Kurash practitioners at the 2018 Asian Games
Ju-jitsu practitioners at the 2018 Asian Games
Asian Games competitors for Yemen